Haji Jalal Mosque  A Qajar dynasty period mosque in Kashmar, Razavi Khorasan Province, Iran.

References

Buildings and structures in Kashmar
Mosques in Iran
National works of Iran
Tourist attractions in Razavi Khorasan Province